Lillywhite is an English surname. Notable people with the surname include:

 Barry Lillywhite (born 1946), British modern pentathlete
 Charles Lillywhite (born , English cricketer
 Chris Lillywhite (born 1966), English cyclist
 Fred Lillywhite (1829–1866), English cricketing entrepreneur
 Henry Lillywhite (1789–1858), English cricketer
 James Lillywhite (1793–?), English cricketer
 James Lillywhite (1842–1929), English Test cricketer, first Test to Australia
 John Lillywhite (1826–1874), English cricketer
 Louis Lillywhite (born 1948), British Army general
 Shae Lillywhite (born 1985), Australian baseball player
 Steve Lillywhite (born 1955), English record producer
 Verl Lillywhite (1926–2007), American football player
 William Lillywhite (1792–1854), English cricketer

See also
 Lilywhite, a song by Cat Stevens, from the album Mona Bone Jakon (1970)
 The Lilywhites, a nickname for Tottenham Hotspur F.C.
 Major Lilywhite, protagonist on the TV series iZombie

English-language surnames